Giga Single is a compilation album released by American hip hop record label Anticon in 2001.

Critical reception
Brian Coleman of CMJ New Music Monthly said: "Ranging from the mellow, soul-searching posse manifesto 'We Ain't Fessin' to Buck 65's Dr. Octagon-ish 'Pen Thief' and Controller 7's excellent instrumental workout, 'Heckles From The Peanut Gallery,' Anticon's strength is obviously its range, with a thread of intelligence, humility and imagination running at all times."

Track listing

References

External links
 

2001 compilation albums
Anticon albums
Record label compilation albums